Bahariya Oasis ("the Northern Oases") is a depression and a naturally rich oasis in the Western Desert of Egypt. It is approximately 370 km away from Cairo. The roughly oval valley extends from northeast to southwest, has a length of 94 km, a maximum width of 42 km and covers an area of about 2000 km².

The valley is surrounded by mountains and has numerous springs. Located in Giza Governorate, the main economic sectors are agriculture, iron ore mining, and tourism. The main agricultural products are guavas, mangos, dates, and olives.

Names

In Ancient Egypt, the oasis had two names. The name 'ḏsḏs' is first mentioned on a scarab dating back to the Middle Kingdom. In the New Kingdom, this name is rarely found, although it does appear for example in the Temple of Luxor and in the account of King Kamose, who occupied the oasis during the war against the Hyksos. From the 25th Dynasty it was almost the only name used. Another name wḥꜣt mḥtt ("the Northern Oasis") was almost exclusively used in the New Kingdom; it appears for instance on the local grave of Amenhotep, and is found again in the list of oasis in the Temple at Edfu.

From 45 CE the depression was known in Latin as Oasis parva (Small Oasis). The Greek historian Strabo (63 BCE – 23 CE) calls it the "Second Oasis"; the 5th century CE historian Olympiodorus of Thebes calls it "the Third Oasis." After the coming of Islam, it was called the Oasis of Bahnasa, "Oasis of Oxyrhynchus".

The southern part of the depression around El Heiz apparently never had a separate name.

Towns
Bahariya consists of many villages, of which El Bawiti is the largest and the administrative center. Qasr is el-Bawiti's neighboring/twin village. To the east, about ten kilometers away are the villages of Mandishah and el-Zabu. A smaller village called el-'Aguz lies between El Bawiti and Mandishah. Harrah, the easternmost village, is a few kilometers east of Mandishah and el-Zabu. El Heiz, also called El-Hayez, is the southernmost village, but it may not always be considered as part of Bahariya because it is so far from the rest of the villages, about fifty kilometers south of El Bawiti. There is an oasis at El-Hayez where mummies have been found on which genetic studies have been conducted.

History

The depression has been populated since the neolithic, although archaeological evidence is not continuous. In El Heiz, a prehistoric settlement site of hunter-gatherers was found with remains of grindstones, arrowheads, scrapers, chisels, and ostrich eggshells. In Qārat el-Abyaḍ, a Czech team led by Miroslav Bárta discovered a settlement of the Old Kingdom. Rock inscriptions in el-Harrah and other records date to the Middle Kingdom and upwards. The tomb of Amenhotep called Huy was erected in Qarat Hilwah at the end of the 18th dynasty. In the 26th dynasty, the depression was culturally and economically flourishing. This can be learned from the chapels in 'Ain el-Muftilla, the tombs in Qārat Qasr Salim and Qarat esh-Sheikh Subi, and the site of Qasr 'Allam.

The Greco-Roman period was a time of prosperity. There is the ruin of a temple to Alexander the Great located in Qasr el-Miqisba ('Ain et-Tibniya). It is believed by some Egyptologists that Alexander passed through Bahariya while returning from the oracle of Ammon at Siwa Oasis. Excavations of the Greco-Roman necropolis found in 1995 and known as the Valley of the Golden Mummies began in 1999. Approximately thirty-four tombs have been excavated from this area. In Roman times, a big military fort was erected at Qarat el-Toub.

In the spring of 2010, a Roman-era mummy was unearthed in a Bahariya Oasis cemetery in el-Harrah. The female mummy was 3 feet tall and covered with plaster decorated to resemble Roman dress and jewellery. In addition to the female mummy, archaeologists found clay and glass vessels, coins, anthropoid masks and fourteen Greco-Roman tombs. Director of Cairo and Giza Antiquities Mahmoud Affifi, the archaeologist who led the dig, said the tomb has a unique design with stairways and corridors, and could date to 300 BC. This find came as a result of excavation work for the construction of a youth center.

In 2019, archaeologists discovered 19 structures and a church carved into the bedrock from the fifth century CE. The church was decorated with religious inscriptions in Greek. In 2021, archaeologists discovered a complex with the ruins of three churches and monks cells date back to the fifth century CE.

During World War I, the Baharia Military Railway was built to provide access to the oasis. In the early 1970s, an asphalt road connecting Bahariya to Cairo was finished. With the new road came electricity, cars, television, phone lines, a more accessible route to Cairo, and, more recently, internet. The spread of people and ideas between Bahariya and Cairo has increased dramatically since the road was constructed. Also, the language of the Waḥātī people has changed under the influence of the Cairo dialect, as heard on television and in music.

People and culture

The people of the oasis, or the Waḥātī people (meaning "of the oasis" in Arabic), are the descendants of the ancient people who inhabited the oasis, ancient tribes with connection to western Egypt and eastern Libya, and the north coast, and other people from the Nile Valley who came to settle in the oasis.

The majority of Waḥātī people in Bahariya are Muslims. There are some mosques in Bahariya. The nature of social settings in the oasis is highly influenced by Islam.

Traditional music is very important to the Waḥātī people. Flutes, drums, and the simsimeyya (a harp-like instrument) are played at social gatherings, particularly at weddings. Traditional songs sung in rural style are passed down from generation to generation, and new songs are invented as well. Music from Cairo, the greater Middle East, and other parts of the world are now easily accessible to the people of the oasis.

Economy

Agriculture is still an important source of income, though now the iron ore industry close to Bahariya provides jobs for many Wahati people. Recently there has also been an increase in tourism to the oasis because of antiquities (tombs, mummies and other artifacts have been discovered there), and because of the beautiful surrounding deserts. Wahati and foreign guides lead adventure desert tours based out of Bahariya to the surrounding White and Black deserts, and sometimes to Siwa or the southern oases. Tourism is a new and important source of income for locals, and it has brought an international presence to the oasis.

Fossils
 
Carcharodontosaurus and Bahariasaurus (meaning "Bahariya lizard") dinosaurs have been found in the Bahariya Formation, which date to about 95 million years ago. Bahariasaurus was a huge theropod, it was described by Ernst Stromer in 1934, though the type specimen was destroyed during World War II in 1944. In 2000, an American scientific team conducted by Joshua Smith found the remains of sauropod dinosaur, the Paralititan stromeri.

The region between the Bahariya and Farafra depressions used to have volcanic activity during the Jurassic Period. In addition, the landscape contains some hills made of barite or calcite crystals, and also golden limestone boulders which became a sanctuary for species, such as white foxes, gazelles and rams.

Notes

See also
 Bahariasaurus (meaning "Bahariya lizard")
 Bahariya Formation (fossil bearing geologic formation)
 Ernst Stromer

References
 Fakhry, Ahmed. Bahria Oasis, Cairo: Government Press, 1942–1950 (2 volumes).
 Fakhry, Ahmed. The oases of Egypt. Vol. II: Bahrīyah and Farafra Oases, Cairo: The American Univ. in Cairo Pr., 1974, reprinted 2003.
 Hawass, Zahi A. Valley of the golden mummies : the greatest Egyptian discovery since Tutankhamen, London: Virgin, 2000.

External links

 Baḥrīya on Wikivoyage

Populated places in Giza Governorate
Oases of Egypt
Western Desert (Egypt)